USS Shawmut, named for the shawmut, is the name of more than one ship of the United States Navy

 , an American Civil War gunboat 1863–1877.
 Massachusetts was renamed  Shawmut (CM-4) in 1917 and then it was renamed  on 1 January 1928.
 Salem (CM-11) was renamed  on 15 August 1945.

References 

United States Navy ship names